Carlos Julián Quintero Noreña (born 5 March 1986) is a Colombian racing cyclist, who currently rides for UCI Continental team .

Major results

2009
 6th Ruota d'Oro
 8th Trofeo Edil C
 9th Gran Premio San Giuseppe
2010
 3rd Trofeo Edil C
 4th Ruota d'Oro
2011
 4th Road race, Pan American Road Championships
2012
 1st  Mountains classification, Four Days of Dunkirk
2013
 7th GP Industria & Artigianato di Larciano
2014
 10th Overall Tour de Langkawi
2015
 1st  Mountains classification, Tirreno–Adriatico
 4th Coppa Bernocchi
 10th Overall Settimana Internazionale di Coppi e Bartali
  Combativity award Stage 14 Vuelta a España
2019
 1st Stage 1 Vuelta a Asturias
 2nd Klasika Primavera
 3rd Overall Tour of Fuzhou
 8th Overall Tour of Quanzhou Bay
2020
 5th Overall Tour du Rwanda
 9th Overall Tour de Langkawi
2021
 1st Grand Prix Velo Alanya
 1st Grand Prix Gündoğmuş
 3rd Overall Tour of Mevlana

Grand Tour general classification results timeline

References

External links

1986 births
Living people
Colombian male cyclists
People from Caldas Department
21st-century Colombian people